Teplička is a municipality and village in Karlovy Vary District in the Karlovy Vary Region of the Czech Republic. It has about 100 inhabitants.

History
The first written mention of Teplička is from 1475.

Gallery

References

Villages in Karlovy Vary District